Gemmula birmanica is an extinct species of sea snail, a marine gastropod mollusk in the family Turridae, the turrids.

Description

Distribution
Fossils of this marine species have been found in Miocene strata of India and Myanmar; in Quaternary strtata of Indonesia; age range: 23.03 to 0.781 Ma

References

  E. Vredenburg. 1921. Comparative diagnoses of Pleurotomidae from the Tertiary formations of Burma. Records of the Geological Survey of India 53:83-129
 P. N. Mukerjee. 1939. Fossil fauna from the Tertiary of Garo Hills, Assam. Palaeontologia Indica 28(1):1-101

birmanica
Gastropods described in 1921